Edward The King is a 2008 two-act play by American playwright David Brendan Hopes. The play is an adaptation of Christopher Marlowe's play Edward II, which in turn is a dramatization of the real-life story of Edward II of England.

Overview
Beset by the duties of his birth and dominated by a heroic father, Edward looks forward to a life of apparent conformity and desperate subterfuge, until he meets Piers Gaveston in a dirty alley. It is love and rebellion at first sight. From then on, Edward steers a perilous course between desire and safety, which does not entirely end even when he becomes king, and faces not only the usual enemies of unconventional love, but his queen and her lover as well. Edward the King neatly straddles the 14th and 21st centuries, which manage to appear almost equally violent and inhospitable to love.

Sources
Edward The King on The Playwrights Database
Edward The King World Premier at GayFest NYC 2008 on Playbill News

Plays based on other plays
Plays based on real people
Adaptations of works by Christopher Marlowe
Cultural depictions of Edward II of England
2008 plays